= Escape from the Studio Tour =

Escape from the Studio Tour may refer to:

- Escape from the Studio Tour (Dream Theater), 2003 tour by co-headliners Dream Theater and Queensrÿche along with Fates Warning
- Escape from the Studio Tour (Korn), 2009 tour by Korn
